Martin Gaston Biron (born August 15, 1977) is a Canadian American former professional ice hockey goaltender.

Drafted by the Buffalo Sabres in the first round (16th overall) of the 1995 NHL Entry Draft, he spent the first half of his 16-year National Hockey League (NHL) career with the Sabres, later having stints with the Philadelphia Flyers, New York Islanders, and New York Rangers. He is currently a television analyst with the Sabres on MSG Western New York.

His younger brother Mathieu played 250 games in the NHL as a defenceman.

Playing career

As a youth, Biron played in the 1991 Quebec International Pee-Wee Hockey Tournament with a minor ice hockey team from Charlesbourg, Quebec City.

Biron started his junior ice hockey career on the Beauport Harfangs of the Quebec Major Junior Hockey League (QMJHL). He made his NHL debut with the Buffalo Sabres on December 26, 1995. An emergency call-up with the Sabres' top three goaltenders all injured, Biron became the fourth-youngest goaltender to start a game in NHL history, surrendering four first-period goals in a 6–3 loss to the Pittsburgh Penguins. After posting a 5.04 goals against average (GAA) with no wins and two losses during his fill-in stint, he was sent back to the QMJHL to develop further. After the 2000–01 season, he was a consistent goaltender for the Sabres as his play in the crease improved drastically.

Biron, along with Rob Ray and Dominik Hašek, was one of the three Sabres against whom, in three consecutive years, the NHL made a specific rule. After NHL statisticians discovered a bug in their new stat-tracking software, the "Biron rule" restricted jersey numbers to whole numbers between 1 and 99 (later limited to numbers between 1 and 98 after the league-wide retirement of number 99 for Wayne Gretzky). Biron was the only NHL player affected, as only he wore "00" at the time. (Goaltender John Davidson also wore 00 during his playing career, without rebuke, at various points between 1973 and 1983.) Upon his return to the NHL three seasons later, Biron switched to number 43, and wore that number until the end of his career.

Biron became the Sabres' starting goaltender after Hašek's departure from Buffalo in 2001 and held the position until the 2004–05 NHL lockout. Biron has always been a fan favorite in Buffalo and although he no longer plays there, he currently resides in the city and after his retirement has a position as director of goaltending at HarborCenter, which is owned and operated by the Sabres organization.

Biron won his 13th consecutive game on December 17, 2005 against the Pittsburgh Penguins. He was the first goalie with 13 straight wins since Chris Osgood accomplished the feat during the 1995-1996 season.

After losing the number one goaltending job to emerging youngster Ryan Miller, Biron requested a trade from the Sabres on June 26, 2006, in an effort to receive more playing time. Finally, on February 27, 2007, the Sabres traded Biron to the Philadelphia Flyers for a second-round draft pick.

On March 27, 2007, Biron signed a two-year, $7 million contract extension with the Flyers to be the starting goaltender in Philadelphia. After appearing in 62 games and recording 30 wins in the 2007–08 season, he led the Flyers to the Eastern Conference Finals, losing in five games to the Eastern Conference champion Pittsburgh Penguins. He appeared in 55 games for the Flyers in the 2008–09 season, winning 29 and helping the Flyers to the fifth-overall seed in the Eastern Conference.

On July 1, 2009, Biron entered free agency. He was soon left in a difficult position after the Flyers signed goaltenders Ray Emery and Brian Boucher, while other teams quickly filled up their goaltending roster needs. Biron soon signed a one-year, $1.4 million contract with the New York Islanders on July 22, 2009, joining goaltenders Dwayne Roloson and Rick DiPietro. In 29 appearances, Biron recorded nine wins, 14 losses and four overtime losses, with a 3.27 goals against average and .896 save percentage. The Islanders did not qualify for the post-season.

On July 1, 2010, Biron signed a two-year, $1.75 million deal with the New York Rangers, where he prepared to back-up Swedish starter Henrik Lundqvist. Biron is one of five players in NHL history to skate for all three teams based in the state of New York. The others were Mike Donnelly, Taylor Pyatt, and former teammates Jason Dawe and Pat LaFontaine. Except for a 2-year stint with the Philadelphia Flyers,
Biron played almost his entire career in the state of New York.
On February 28, 2011, Biron fractured his collarbone during practice and was forced to miss the remainder of the 2010–11 season. While he played in the lowest number of games (17) since his second NHL season in 1998–99, he posted career highs in save percentage (.923) and goals against average (2.13).
On June 29, 2012 Biron re-signed with the Rangers in a one-way contract worth $2.6 million over two years, working out to an average of $1.3 million per year.

On October 14, 2013, the Rangers placed Biron on waivers after a poor start to the season, and the following day, he was assigned to play with the Hartford Wolf Pack of the American Hockey League (AHL). Biron announced his retirement via social media on October 20, 2013, choosing retirement over playing in the minor leagues. He ended his career with a 230–191–25–27 record, 2.62 goals against average and a .910 save percentage.

Post-playing career
He currently works as a studio analyst with the Sabres and the Sabres Hockey Network on MSG Western New York. Previously, he was an analyst on the TSN panel along with James Duthie, Aaron Ward and Bob McKenzie, worked on NHL Network, and did studio work for the New York Islanders. He is also the director of goaltending at the Academy of Hockey at the Buffalo HarborCenter. Biron also stars on the popular Buffalo sports podcast, "Sabres Live", with former teammates Brian Duff.

On February 21, 2017, Biron received United States citizenship. He sought U.S. citizenship because he had married an American citizen and has resided with her and their four children in Buffalo for several years; but as he was not a U.S. citizen, he could not vote in American elections, and because he did not reside in Canada he could not vote in his native country.

Biron was inducted into the Rochester Americans Hall of Fame on February 16, 2018.

Awards
 QMJHL All-Rookie Team (1995)
 Canadian Major Junior First All-Star Team (1995)
 Canadian Major Junior Goaltender of the Year (1995)
 AHL First All-Star Team (1999)
 Harry "Hap" Holmes Memorial Award (fewest goals against - AHL) (1999) (shared with Tom Draper)
 Aldege "Baz" Bastien Memorial Award (Outstanding Goaltender - AHL) (1999)
 Robert W. Clarke Trophy with the Rochester Americans (1999)

Career statistics

Regular season and playoffs

International

See also
 Notable families in the NHL
 List of Buffalo Sabres broadcasters

References

External links

 
 Profile at Hockey Goalies

1977 births
Living people
Beauport Harfangs players
Bridgeport Sound Tigers players
Buffalo Sabres announcers
Buffalo Sabres draft picks
Buffalo Sabres players
Canadian emigrants to the United States
Canadian ice hockey goaltenders
French Quebecers
Hull Olympiques players
Ice hockey people from Quebec City
National Hockey League first-round draft picks
Naturalized citizens of the United States
New York Islanders players
New York Rangers players
Philadelphia Flyers players
Rochester Americans players
South Carolina Stingrays players